Agrupación Deportiva Sabiñánigo is a Spanish football team based in Sabiñánigo, in the autonomous community of Aragon. Founded in 1956 it plays in Tercera División – Group 17, holding home games at Estadio Joaquín Ascaso, with a 3,800-seat capacity.

Season to season

42 seasons in Tercera División

External links
Futbolme team profile 

Football clubs in Aragon
Sabiñánigo
Association football clubs established in 1956
1956 establishments in Spain